Overcast! is Atmosphere's breakthrough EP album, released in 1997.

Track listing
 Scapegoat (Album Version)
 Multiples
 Primer
 The Outernet 
 Scapegoat (...It's Edited For The Radio) 
 Sound Is Vibration
 Brief Description
 God's Bathroom Floor (Stress's 4-track Fiasco)

References

Atmosphere (music group) albums
1998 EPs
Rhymesayers Entertainment EPs